Shit Brook is a culverted small stream in Much Wenlock, Shropshire, England.

History 
The stream, which was named Shit Brook because it was the open sewer for the town, ran parallel with the road leading towards Holy Trinity Church. In the 14th century it was culverted, its course now under Victoria Road, High Street, Back Lane, Bull Ring and along the north side of the Priory precinct. The diverted stream drained into the River Severn near Buildwas Abbey. When the stream was paved over to make a lane, people used it as a shortcut to get to the town's Holy Trinity Church. Use of the path eventually declined towards 1775 as a result of the Inclosure Act 1773.

In 1540, it was known as the "Schetebrok", which was noted by John Leland. In 1847, it was listed as "Sytche" on Ordnance Survey maps, which drew conclusions that it had some relation to a similarly named stream at Burslem in Stoke-on-Trent. In the 1990s, there was a structural survey carried out on Shit Brook which discovered that the culvert was in poor condition as it had collapsed in places, which led to flooding of nearby properties. A programme to repair the culvert was proposed by Shropshire County Council Archaeology Service to refurbish it. In 2013, it was listed as a location for new flood defences to be built in the United Kingdom.

In 1994, Shit Brook was featured in an episode of Channel 4's archaeology programme Time Team.

References 

Rivers of Shropshire
Much Wenlock